Dennis Kohlruss (born 14 May 1988) is a German strongman competitor from Rastatt and the reigning Germany's Strongest Man. He's also a regular entrant to the Strongman Champions League and a six time podium finisher. He has competed in 27 International strongman competitions and have won the 2020 SCL World Record Breakers and 2021 Megatron competitions.

Background
At the age of 21, during his military service in the Bundeswehr, he stumbled across YouTube videos of 1998 World's Strongest Man Magnus Samuelsson and found enthusiasm for the sport of strongman.

Personal Records
Log press -  (German Record)
Log press -  x 3 reps
Louis Cyr Dumbbell press -  (German Record)
Viking press -  x 12 reps
Deadlift (18" partial lift/ side handles) - 
Fingal's fingers -  (5 fingers) in 79.00 seconds
Tractor pull -  18 meters in 36.80 seconds

References

1988 births
Living people
German strength athletes